Reginald Arness "Reggie" Wells (born November 3, 1980) is a former American football guard. He was drafted by the Arizona Cardinals in the sixth round of the 2003 NFL Draft. He played college football at Clarion. Wells has also played for the Philadelphia Eagles, Carolina Panthers, Buffalo Bills, and San Diego Chargers.

Early years
Wells attended South Park High School in South Park, Pennsylvania, where he lettered in basketball and football. In football, as a senior, he was an All-League defensive end and helped lead his team to the League title. He was also an integral member of the 1997 team that captured the PIAA AA State Championship.

College career
At Clarion University, Wells was a four-year starter, garnering two NCAA Division II All-America honors, and was a two-time All-Pennsylvania State Athletic Conference choice.

Professional career

Arizona Cardinals
Wells was drafted in the sixth round (177th overall) of the 2003 NFL Draft by the Arizona Cardinals. Wells scored his first NFL touchdown by recovering an Edgerrin James fumble in the end zone during week 5 of the 2007 NFL season.

Philadelphia Eagles
Wells was traded to the Philadelphia Eagles on September 3, 2010 in exchange for a 6th round draft pick in 2011. He re-signed with Philadelphia on August 20, 2011, after becoming a free agent following the 2010 season. He was released during final roster cuts on September 3.

Carolina Panthers
On September 13, 2011, Wells signed with the Carolina Panthers, only to be released on September 20. He was re-signed on October 19 after Jeff Otah was placed on injured reserve. He was released yet again on November 30, 2011.

2012
On August 8, 2012, Wells signed with the Green Bay Packers,  but was released just 3 weeks later on August 31, 2012.

On September 11, 2012, Wells was signed by the San Diego Chargers. However, he was released five days later. On October 9, 2012, Wells was signed by the Buffalo Bills. He was waived 10 days later.

References

External links
 Green Bay Packers bio
 Philadelphia Eagles bio

1980 births
Living people
Players of American football from Pennsylvania
American football offensive guards
American football offensive tackles
Clarion University of Pennsylvania alumni
Arizona Cardinals players
Philadelphia Eagles players
Carolina Panthers players
San Diego Chargers players
Buffalo Bills players
Green Bay Packers players